Nelson Sarmento Viegas (born 24 December 1999) is a football player who currently plays for Timor-Leste national football team as a defender. Born in Indonesia, he represents the Timor-Leste national team.

International career
Viegas scored his first international goal against Cambodia on 21 October 2016.

International goals

References

1999 births
Living people
East Timorese footballers
Timor-Leste international footballers
Association football defenders
Footballers at the 2018 Asian Games
Competitors at the 2017 Southeast Asian Games
Asian Games competitors for East Timor
Competitors at the 2019 Southeast Asian Games
Competitors at the 2021 Southeast Asian Games
Southeast Asian Games competitors for East Timor